Acolbifene/prasterone (tentative brand name Femivia) is a combination formulation of acolbifene, a selective estrogen receptor modulator, and prasterone (dehydroepiandrosterone; DHEA), an androgen, estrogen, and neurosteroid, which is under development by Endoceutics for the treatment of vasomotor symptoms (hot flashes) in postmenopausal women. It is intended for use by mouth. As of December 2017, it is in phase III clinical trials for this indication.

See also
 List of investigational sex-hormonal agents § Estrogenics

References

External links
 Acolbifene/prasterone - AdisInsight
 Pipeline - Endoceutics

Androgens and anabolic steroids
Combination drugs
Experimental drugs
Neurosteroids
Selective estrogen receptor modulators